Olliver Peak is a rock peak (630 m) along the edge of Ross Ice Shelf. It stands at the east side of the mouth of Barrett Glacier and is the northwesternmost summit in Gabbro Hills. Named by Advisory Committee on Antarctic Names (US-ACAN) for Commander George R. Olliver, U.S. Navy, who was injured in the crash of an Otter aircraft on December 22, 1955, following a take-off from near Cape Bird.

Mountains of Antarctica
Dufek Coast